The Gáva-Holigrady culture was a late Bronze Age culture of Eastern Slovakia, Western Ukraine (Zakarpats'ka Oblast and Dnister river basin), Northwestern  Romania, Moldova, and Northeastern Hungary.

It is considered a subtype of the Urnfield culture.

Gava-Holigrady culture is named after an archaeological settlement Gava in Northeastern Hungary and an archaeological site Holigrady (Голігради) in Ukrainian Ternopil Oblast.

In Slovakia, the culture originated in the early 12th century BC.

Gáva people lived in settlements and castles that they built in the Slovakian and Transylvanian uplands.

Gava-Holigrad people are considered to be of Thracian ethnicity.

Lăpuş Group

The Lăpuş Group is considered to be a Romanian counterpart of the Gáva-Holigrady culture.

References

Urnfield culture
Archaeological cultures of Central Europe
Archaeological cultures of Eastern Europe
Archaeological cultures of Southeastern Europe
Bronze Age cultures of Europe
Thracian archaeological cultures
Archaeological cultures in Hungary
Archaeological cultures in Romania
Archaeological cultures in Slovakia
Archaeological cultures in Ukraine
Articles needing translation from Polish Wikipedia